Lubiano is a village in Álava, Basque Country, Spain.

Geography
Located in the northeast corner of town at the foot of Mount Iturriaga (625 m ).  The environmental make-up consists of large oak groves and swamps. 

Populated places in Álava